Venus as a Boy is a 2004 fiction novella by Scottish writer and musician Luke Sutherland, his third publication following two earlier novels, Jelly Roll (1998) and Sweetmeat (2002).  

It is set briefly in South Ronaldsay, Orkney, an island off the coast of Scotland though it is largely set in Soho, London. The author purports to tell the posthumous story of Désirée, who apparently was a clandestine peer of his growing up in South Ronaldsay. Désirée's audio-recorded memoirs presented to the novel's author by Désirée's friend and confidant Pascal serve as the narrative throughout majority of the story.

The novella draws on Sutherland's own childhood in the Orkney Islands.  Sutherland and his sister were the only Scots-Africans on South Ronaldsay, having been adopted by white parents.

See also
Venus as a Boy Björk's song
Venus as a Boy 2021 film

References

2004 British novels
Scottish novels
British novellas
Novels set in Orkney
British LGBT novels
Novels set in London
Bloomsbury Publishing books